Charbhadrasan Government College or Charbhadrasan Govt. College is a public college, located in Charbhadrasan, Faridpur, Bangladesh. It offers higher-secondary education (HSC). It has bachelor's degree and master's degree programmes as well, which divisions are affiliated with National University. Currently Professor Md. Bilal Hossain is the principal of the college. The EIIN of the college is 108728.

Academic departments

References

Colleges in Faridpur District
Universities and colleges in Faridpur District
Educational institutions established in 1968